Siculeni  is a commune in Harghita County, Romania. It lies in the Székely Land, an ethno-cultural region in eastern Transylvania. The Siculicidium took place here.

The commune is composed of a single village, Siculeni. In 2004, four villages broke off to form Ciceu and Racu Communes.

Demographics
According to the 2011 census, the commune has a population of 2,711. Of these, 94.46% were Hungarians and 5.49% Romanians.

History

The village was part of the Székely Land region of the historical Transylvania province.

Its Hungarian name was first recorded in 1567 in the form of Amadeffalwa (Amadé's village), and in 1602 the village is already mentioned by a shortened forms as Madéfalva which became the names of the village. Later, until 1899 the official name of the city was Csík-Mádéfalva. The Romanian form of its name was Madefalău, The authorities renamed it for the current official name after 1919.

The Siculicidium, or the Massacre at Madéfalva of January 7, 1764 took place here. 200 Székely were killed by Maria Theresa's Habsburg army as the local Székely Hungarians refused to join as recruits the newly organized borderguard regiments. Following the massacre, a great number of Székely people began to flee the region crossing the Carpathian Mountains into Bukovina and Moldova. The massacre's Latin name is Siculicidium, traditionally written as SICVLICIDIVM. A monument in memory of the massacre was erected on October 8, 1905.

The village administratively belonged to Csíkszék district until the administrative reform of Transylvania in 1876, when it fell within the Csík County in the Kingdom of Hungary. After the Treaty of Trianon of 1920, the village became part of Romania and fell within Ciuc County during the interwar period. In 1940, the second Vienna Award granted the Northern Transylvania to Hungary and the villages were held by Hungary until 1944. After Soviet occupation, the Romanian administration returned and the village became officially part of Romania in 1947. Always inside Romania, between 1952 and 1960, the commune fell within the so-called Magyar Autonomous Region, between 1960 and 1968 the Mureș-Magyar Autonomous Region. In 1968, Romania administration was organized in 42 counties, and since then, the commune has been part of Harghita County.

The commune used to comprise several villages, but as from 2004 the village of Ciceu (Csicsó) forms an independent commune with the village of Ciaracio (Csaracsó). The village of Racu (Csíkrákos) along with the village of Satu Nou (Göröcsfalva) also forms an independent commune.

Gallery

See also
 Siculicidium

References

Communes in Harghita County
Localities in Transylvania